Zha Liangzheng (5 April 1918 - 26 February 1977), better known by his pen name Mu Dan, was a Chinese poet. Born in Tianjin, he attended Tsinghua University at the age of 17, and graduated from National Southwestern Associated University in 1940. He served as an assistant lecturer of English at his alma mater for about two years. During World War II, he joined the Chinese Expeditionary Force in Burma and fought alongside the Allied forces against the Japanese. After the war ended, he attended the University of Chicago, where he obtained a master's degree in English literature. He was a distant paternal relative of the wuxia novelist Louis Cha.
                            
Most of Zha's poems were written during the late 1930s and 1940s. His poetry, which is characterised by impassioned speculation, abstract sensuality, and occasionally, restrained irony, is the foremost example of Chinese new vernacular verse absorbing modern Western techniques. Zha was a professed admirer of W. H. Auden, W. B. Yeats and T. S. Eliot. He studied their poetry at Southwest Associated University under William Empson, himself a leading modernist poet. On the other hand, the patriotism and the compassion for the suffering and needy in his poetry fall easily in line with a great tradition in Chinese poetry.

Zha had to give up poetry writing several years after the establishment of the People's Republic of China in 1949, and he turned to literary translation, for which he is also renowned. His works in this respect include the Chinese translations of Lord Byron's Don Juan and Aleksandr Pushkin's Eugene Onegin. It was not until 1976 that Zha resumed writing poetry. He produced 27 poems that year; highly regarded among them were several moving elegy-style pieces, prophetic of his sudden death of a heart attack in early 1977.

External links

Mu Dan. Britannica.

1918 births
1977 deaths
Republic of China poets
People's Republic of China poets
Tianjin Nankai High School alumni
National Southwestern Associated University alumni
Tsinghua University alumni
University of Chicago alumni
Academic staff of Nankai University
Poets from Tianjin
People's Republic of China translators
Victims of the Cultural Revolution
20th-century Chinese translators
Chinese expatriates in the United States